Marine Lorphelin (born 16 March 1993) is a French model and beauty pageant titleholder who was crowned Miss France 2013 on 8 December 2012, representing the region of Burgundy and then represented France at Miss World 2013 and placed 1st runner up.

Education

Lorphelin attended the College Bréart, and the Lycée Lamartine in Mâcon, named after the famous French poet and politician hailing from Mâcon, Alphonse de Lamartine. Her hobbies are painting, art and fashion. She graduated with highest honors in 2011 from high school with a focus on science and was admitted to the Universite Claude Bernard, Lyon 1's school of medicine.

In 2018, Lorphelin is in her first year of family medicine residency in Paris.

Miss France
Miss Bourgogne 2012 title winner, Marine Lorphelin was crowned Miss France 2013 by the winner of the previous year Delphine Wespiser (Miss France 2012) at the grand finale of the 66th edition of Miss France beauty pageant at the Zenith in Limoges on Grand coronation night of Saturday 8 December 2012.

As Miss France, Marine Lorphelin has promoted two causes: children's health and the donation of organs. She has signed documents expressing her wish for her organs to be donated post-mortem to those in need, has run in the 2013 Paris Marathon, and has performed numerous dangerous tasks in the Fort Boyard programme to raise 18,000 euros for Mecenat Chirurgie Cardiaque, a French charity that raises money for the heart transplants of children suffering from heart disease. To achieve this, she had to perform tasks as difficult as a bungee jump, riding a bicycle underwater, and diving in ice-cold water to uncover clues about the prize. She participated in the programme for the second time in June 2014.

Marine Lorphelin has also participated twice in the Mot de Passe tournament (the French version of the Million Dollar Password) and once in the Qui veut gagner des millions? programme, winning 48,000 euros in the latter to combat AIDS.

Miss World
Marine Lorphelin was the First (1st) Runner up at Miss World 2013, a beauty pageant that was held in Indonesia, out of 131 contestants. As the highest-scored European candidate, she also won the title of Miss World Europe.

Before the final, she was selected as the 1st runner up of Miss Beach Beauty Fashion, 2nd runner up in the Miss Top Model competition, finished in the 6th place for Miss Beauty with a Purpose, and the win Best World Dress Designer (Spectacular Evening Wear).

References

External links

1993 births
Living people
People from Mâcon
Miss France winners
Miss World 2013 delegates